J. Page Wadsworth was the fifth chancellor of the University of Waterloo, serving from 1985 to 1991.

Personal life
Wadsworth was a banking executive.

University of Waterloo
He served as the fifth chancellor of the University of Waterloo, from 1985 to 1991. Wadsworth was granted the status of Chancellor Emeritus on May 27, 1993 at the University of Waterloo's 66th convocation.

See also
 List of University of Waterloo people

References

Chancellors of the University of Waterloo
Living people
Year of birth missing (living people)